Isham Sweat was a state legislator in North Carolina. He served in the North Carolina House of Representatives representing Cumberland County.

He was born in North Carolina. He was described as "mulatto".

He lived in Fayetteville. He was part of the colored convention held in Raleigh in 1865.

He was a barber.

See also
African-American officeholders during and following the Reconstruction era

References

Year of birth missing
Year of death missing
Members of the North Carolina House of Representatives